A doghouse, also known as a kennel, is an outbuilding to provide shelter for a dog from various weather conditions.

Background

Humans and domesticated dogs have been companions for more than 15,000 years, beginning with the wolf and hunter–gatherers.  Initially, dogs would inhabit the outdoors staying close to humans.  Mud was used to construct the earliest known doghouses. Over the millennia crude doghouses were built from the scrap material that was available to owners at the particular time and place.

During the Industrial Revolution and economies of scale allowed manufactured doghouses to become a commodity that could be sold to the mass market. Mass production allowed manufacturers to improve the design and quality of materials used to construct a doghouse.

During the 1800s, the animal rights movement began creating legislation for animal rights and animal welfare.  This allowed the creation of organizations like the humane society and the Society for the Prevention of Cruelty to Animals (SPCA), which have set standards of care for dogs that live outdoors including a properly designed doghouse that is structurally sound, weatherproof, insulated, of adequate size and appropriate for the dog's use, at all times.  Municipalities enforce legislation to protect dogs living outdoors with the animal control service.

In modern times, a wide variety of materials are used to make doghouses, including: hardboard, hard wood, plywood, and plastic.  Do it yourself (DIY) projects allow owners to construct the doghouse to their exact design specifications using the best possible materials for their dogs needs.

Gallery

See also

 Animal shelter
 Eddie's House
 Kennel

References

External links

 Ontario SPCA - Ideal Doghouse for Outdoor use in Ontario, Canada
 Ron Hazelton's HouseCalls—Includes step-by-step video instructions and free blueprints for a custom doghouse.
 Building a Small Dog House Includes detailed images with the construction process, as well as a list with the materials and tools needed for the project.

Buildings and structures used to confine animals
Dog equipment